Sasagiu Rapids Provincial Park is a provincial park in Manitoba, Canada. It is located 85 kilometres south of Thompson on Highway 6, and covers all portions of unsubdivided Sections 10 and 15 Township 71 Range 7 W.P.M. shown on Plan 19853.
It lies in the southwestern portion of the Mystery Lake Local Government District.

Overview
 The main feature of this small park is the Sasagiu Rapids, a rapids in the Grass River between Setting Lake and Brostrom Lake, that runs under the highway.

The park was formed in 1974 as a small wayside park, and expanded its boundaries later.

The park area was leased to a private operator in 1992 and continues to operate solely as a campground and recreation area.

Accommodations
There is a privately operated campground encompassing the boundaries of the park called Sasagiu Rapids Campground. The Sasagiu Rapids Lodge and campsites (different owner) are just outside the park campground's south and east boundary.

See also
List of Manitoba parks

External links

Sasagiu Rapids Campground

References

Manitoba park information

Provincial parks of Manitoba
Protected areas established in 1974
1974 establishments in Manitoba
Protected areas of Manitoba